Günter Heimbeck (born June 23, 1946 in Gunzenhausen, Germany) is a German–Namibian retired professor of mathematics. His particular research interest is geometry; the Heimbeck Planes are named for him. Heimbeck probably is the first and only Namibian scholar to have a scientific sub-discipline carry his name.

Heimbeck studied mathematics at University of Würzburg from 1965. He completed his PhD in 1974, and his habilitation in 1981. He then became lecturer at his alma mater. In 1985 Heimbeck emigrated to South Africa, where he taught at the University of the Witwatersrand in Johannesburg. In 1987 he took up a professorship for mathematics at the University of Namibia. Heimbeck is advisor to the Namibian Ministry of Education.

References

1946 births
Living people
20th-century German mathematicians
21st-century German mathematicians
Namibian mathematicians
People from Gunzenhausen